Bearspaw Christian School (BCS) is a non-denominational, private Christian school for Junior Kindergarten to Grade 12. BCS is located in the northwest corner of Calgary, Alberta with an enrolment of 720+ students.

BCS is accredited by Alberta Education and is affiliated with the Association of Christian Schools International (ACSI), the Association of Independent Schools and Colleges of Alberta (AISCA), and the Independent Schools' Athletic Association (ISAA).

Important Facts / Statistics 
 Founded in 1998 on the current campus
 Located on 39 Acres in NW Calgary (15001 – 69 Street NW)
 Junior Kindergarten – Grade 12
 Enrolment: 720+ Students [Fall 2014 Enrolment]
 Non-denominational, private school
 Independent School (not part of the Public School System)

External links 
 

Elementary schools in Calgary
Middle schools in Calgary
High schools in Calgary
Christian schools in Canada
Private schools in Alberta
Educational institutions established in 1998
1998 establishments in Alberta